The 1992 Baylor Bears football team (variously "Baylor", "BU", or the "Bears") represented Baylor University in the 1992 NCAA Division I-A football season. They were represented in the Southwest Conference. They played their home games at Floyd Casey Stadium in Waco, Texas. They were coached by head coach Grant Teaff, who retired following the conclusion of the season after 21 years as head coach of the Bears.

Schedule

References

Baylor
Baylor Bears football seasons
Sun Bowl champion seasons
Baylor Bears football